Jeremy Strong may refer to:
* Jeremy Strong (actor), American actor
 Jeremy Strong (author) (born 1949), English children's author